John Reith may refer to:
John Reith, 1st Baron Reith (1889–1971), Scottish broadcasting executive
John Reith (British Army officer) (born 1948)